Chechian is a village the Mirpur Tehsil of Mirpur District of Azad Kashmir, Pakistan.

Demography
According to 1998 census of Pakistan, its population was 663.

Name
The village gets its name from the Chechi clan of the Gujjar tribe.

Local geography
Chechian is situated around 10 kilometres from the Mirpur AJK City. It is surrounded by mountains on one side and famous River Jhelum on the other side. The nearest towns include Mangla, Afzalpur and Jatlaan. The famous Pakistani city of Jhelum is also not far if you decide to cross the river by boat.
The famous landmarks of the village include world famous shrine of Sufi and poet of Punjabi language Mian Muhammed Bukhash (Author of Saif-Al-Mlook), Women Degree College Chechian and Islamic University Campus for Men.
Shrine or Darbaar hosts many events and religious gatherings throughout the year and also offers a free meal for all every day.

The Chechian's main shopping market or bazaar is one of the biggest in the town and many shoppers come here from neighbouring villages and towns.
The main occupation of people here is farming and agriculture. Chechian is very famous for its Basmati rice.

Power and water
Chechian has power from Mangla Dam a hydroelectric station providing the region with green energy! The village experiences power-cuts of a few minutes a night on a frequent basis.
The nearby river Jehlum has hydroelectric turbines running throughout it. It has many bridges: (pedestrian, animal & scooter/ motorbike crossings, others big enough for vehicles) along its length connecting the two sides.
Chechian still lacks basic running water pipes & a water treatment plant. Most water drank by the people is from private wells or bottled water. The local water is safe to drink but not is recommended for non-locals.
Most plastic, metal, paper, other recyclable materiel is collected by some people and sold in the city of Mirpur as a means of income.

Education
There is a government degree college for women in Chechian.
There are also several elementary schools for both genders.
There is an Islamic university for males. The university requires no fees or money from its students/public as it is funded by the local "Khari Sharif Peer Shah Gazi Darbar"  – which is a famous monastery and shrine.
The Monastery also provides Quran classes on a daily basis and free food for all every Friday; it is considered a blessing and people from all ranks of society are encouraged to eat together and as one.

References

Populated places in Mirpur District